The Cunliffe Baronetcy, of Liverpool in the County of Lancaster, is a title in the Baronetage of Great Britain. It was created on 26 March 1759 for Sir Ellis Cunliffe, a slave trader and Member of Parliament for Liverpool. The fourth Baronet was a General in the Bengal Army. The fifth Baronet represented Flint Boroughs and Denbigh Boroughs in the House of Commons.

Three other members of the family may also be mentioned. George Gordon Cunliffe (1829-1900), son of Brooke Cunliffe, fourth son of the third Baronet, was a major-general in the British Army. His son Frederick Hugh Gordon Cunliffe (1861–1955) was a brigadier-general in the Seaforth Highlanders. Robert Lionel Brooke Cunliffe, son of Colonel Foster Lionel Brooke, son of the aforementioned Brooke Cunliffe, fourth son of the third Baronet, was a captain in the Royal Navy.

Cunliffe baronets, of Liverpool (1759)
Sir Ellis Cunliffe, Kt., 1st Baronet (1717–1767)
Sir Robert Cunliffe, 2nd Baronet (1719–1778)
Sir Foster Cunliffe, 3rd Baronet (1755–1834)
Sir Robert Henry Cunliffe, 4th Baronet, Kt., CB (1785–1859)
Sir Robert Alfred Cunliffe, 5th Baronet (1839–1905)
Sir Foster Hugh Egerton Cunliffe, 6th Baronet (1875–1916)
Sir Robert Neville Henry Cunliffe, 7th Baronet (1884–1949)
Sir Cyril Henley Cunliffe, 8th Baronet (1901–1969)
Sir David Ellis Cunliffe, 9th Baronet (born 1957)

Notes

References
Kidd, Charles, Williamson, David (editors). Debrett's Peerage and Baronetage (1990 edition). New York: St Martin's Press, 1990,

External links
History of the Cunliffe family

Cunliffe
1759 establishments in Great Britain